American Academy may refer to:

 American Academy in Berlin, a research and cultural institution
 American Academy in Rome, a research and arts institution
 American Academy of Arts and Letters
 American Academy of Arts and Sciences, frequently known as the American Academy, an honorary society and center for policy research
 American Academy of Larnaca, a private school in Larnaca, Cyprus 
 Dubai American Academy, a private school
 Üsküdar American Academy, a private school in Istanbul

See also
 National_academy#Academies by country